Pintoa may refer to:
 Pintoa (wasp), a genus of wasps in the family Trichogrammatidae
 Pintoa (plant), a genus of plants in the family Zygophyllaceae